Luoyang railway station is a station on Longhai railway in Luoyang, Henan.

History
The station was opened in 1912 as Jinguyuan railway station on Luoyang-Tongguan railway, which commenced construction in 1910.

The station was expanded during 1957-1958 and was renamed to its current name on 1 January 1959.

The station was renovated in 2009 for the China 2009 World Stamp Exhibition.

Metro Station
Line 2 of the Luoyang Subway opened on 26 December 2021.

See also
 Luoyang Longmen railway station

References

Railway stations in Henan
Stations on the Longhai Railway
Railway stations in China opened in 1912